Javier Padilla (born 12 July 1930) is a Mexican sports shooter. He competed in the men's 50 metre free pistol event at the 1976 Summer Olympics.

References

1930 births
Living people
Mexican male sport shooters
Olympic shooters of Mexico
Shooters at the 1976 Summer Olympics
Sportspeople from León, Guanajuato
Pan American Games medalists in shooting
Pan American Games bronze medalists for Mexico
Shooters at the 1975 Pan American Games
20th-century Mexican people